Pselaphostena is a genus of beetles in the family Mordellidae, containing the following species:

 Pselaphostena antennata Franciscolo, 1951
 Pselaphostena arnoldi Franciscolo, 1950
 Pselaphostena calcarata Franciscolo, 1957
 Pselaphostena congoana Ermisch, 1952
 Pselaphostena diversicornis Franciscolo, 1951
 Pselaphostena fahraei Ermisch, 1953
 Pselaphostena fulvosignata Franciscolo, 1957
 Pselaphostena longepalpalpis Franciscolo, 1951
 Pselaphostena occidentalis Franciscolo, 1957
 Pselaphostena praetoriana Franciscolo, 1951
 Pselaphostena pulchripennis Franciscolo, 1957
 Pselaphostena rhodesiensis Franciscolo, 1951
 Pselaphostena vansoni Franciscolo, 1951

References

Mordellidae